Iris Kaufman Holland (September 30, 1920 – July 19, 2001) was an American politician.

Born in Springfield, Massachusetts, Holland went to Rider College. She lived in New London, Connecticut for twelve years, then moved back to Springfield, Massachusetts, and subsequently moved to Longmeadow, Massachusetts. Holland served in the Massachusetts House of Representatives from 1973 until 1991 as a Republican. She died in Longmeadow, Massachusetts.

See also
 Massachusetts House of Representatives' 2nd Hampden district
 169th Massachusetts General Court

Notes

1920 births
2001 deaths
Politicians from New London, Connecticut
People from Longmeadow, Massachusetts
Politicians from Springfield, Massachusetts
Rider University alumni
Women state legislators in Massachusetts
Republican Party members of the Massachusetts House of Representatives
20th-century American politicians
20th-century American women politicians